Potomania (From Latin pōtō "I drink (liquor)" + mania) is a specific hypo-osmolality syndrome related to massive consumption of beer, which is poor in solutes and electrolytes. With little food or other sources of electrolytes, consumption of large amounts of beer or other dilute alcoholic drinks leads to electrolyte disturbances, where the body does not have enough nutrients known as electrolytes, namely sodium, potassium, and magnesium.  The symptoms of potomania are similar to other causes of hyponatremia and include dizziness, muscular weakness, neurological impairment and seizures, all related to hyponatremia and hypokalaemia. While the symptoms of potomania are similar to other causes of hyponatremia and acute water intoxication, it should be considered an independent clinical entity because of its often chronic nature of onset, pathophysiology,  and presentation of symptoms.

Pathophysiology
The normal human kidney, through suppression of anti-diuretic hormone, is normally able to excrete vast amounts of dilute urine. Thus a normal adult can drink up to 20 liters per day of water without becoming hyponatremic. However, the intake of solutes is also necessary to excrete free water. Under normal circumstances, this is clinically irrelevant. In the lack of proper solute intake, the amount of free water excretion can be severely limited. Without adequate solute intake, the normal functioning electrolyte gradient that pulls water into urine will be effectively destroyed.

Briefly, to excrete free water from urine, the urine flow (which is solute clearance + free water clearance) will equal the rate of solute excretion divided by the urine osmolality. With a diet of only solute-poor beer, only about 200–300 mOSM (normal 750 mOSM to greater than 900 mOSM) of solute will be excreted per day, capping the amount of free water excretion at four liters. Any intake above 4 liters would lead to a dilution of the serum sodium concentration and thus hyponatremia.

Any vomiting or GI absorptive problems due to alcohol intoxication can also compound the effect of potomania due to additional electrolyte and acid-base disturbances.

Diagnosis

Treatment
As with all cases of hyponatremia, extreme caution must be taken to avoid the fatal consequences of rapidly correcting electrolytes (e.g. central pontine myelinolysis, edema). Special considerations with the treatment of potomania are needed. Because this could be a chronic condition, low sodium may be normal for the patient, so an especially careful correction is warranted.  It is also very important to note that due to the normal kidney function, and lack of other intrinsic or toxic cause of the electrolyte disturbance, restoration of dietary solutes will correct the electrolytes to normal serum levels. This again must be done with caution.

See also
 Holiday heart syndrome
 Hyponatremia
 Primary polydipsia
 Water intoxication

References

)

http://renalfellow.blogspot.com/2009/03/beer-potomania.html

Alcohol and health